A resurrection stone is a stone of immense weight which was hired out to prevent newly buried corpses from being stolen.

List of resurrection stones in the United Kingdom
 St Laurence Church, Lurgashall
 Llantrisant
 Dean Row Chapel, Wilmslow

References

History of anatomy
Burial monuments and structures
Body snatching